Audio Secrecy is the third studio album by American rock band Stone Sour. It was recorded and produced by the band and Nick Raskulinecz at Blackbird Studios in Nashville, Tennessee. On June 10, the band released a free download of "Mission Statement", which was later released as a single on iTunes. The first official single, "Say You'll Haunt Me", however, was released on July 6, 2010. Audio Secrecy is also the first album by the band to not feature a 'Parental Advisory' sticker and is dedicated to Slipknot bassist Paul Gray, who had died earlier in 2010. It is also the band's last album to feature bassist Shawn Economaki, and their first album to featured the same members from the previous album.

Critical reception

Audio Secrecy received generally positive reviews from music critics. Tim Grierson of About.com compared the band to Slipknot stating that Stone Sour delivers loud and powerful love songs and that the album in whole displayed Corey Taylor's flexibility in music. Gregory Heaney of Allmusic praised Taylor's voice stating that he has made full use of his voice "from guttural to soaring". He also related the "chugging guitar" work of the album to that of Deftones.

Lenny Vowels, a senior critic of 411mania.com awarded the album seven out of ten stars summarizing his review by stating "Stone Sour's newest record does seem to yearn for new heights, but for some reason can't quite reach them. The mood is definitely darker than their previous two albums, though that doesn't mean it's better. Basically, what's good on the album is great, and while nothing's bad, the rest doesn't come off as anything special either. In the band's personal history, I'd rank it above Come What(ever) May overall, but their self-titled album still leads the pack. Either way, this record is worth having if you're a fan of the band, but don't expect much in the way of new."

Sales
Audio Secrecy debuted in the top 10 in various countries. In the US, it sold 46,000 copies in its first week and debuted at No. 6 on the Billboard 200.

Track listing
All lyrics by Corey Taylor. Music written by Stone Sour

Unreleased songs
At least two more songs were created during the Audio Secrecy recording sessions. One of them is called "The Pessimist". The song is mentioned in the official Stone Sour biography. "For guitarist Josh Rand, the track 'The Pessimist' holds a special significance. 'It's the heaviest song we've done up to this point. I spent a day and a half studying the Hindu scale for the lead. The guitar solo for that song has a very Eastern sound.' The song sees Rand shredding with a precise, powerful solo that's melodic and metallic. All the while, it preserves a unique feel." "The Pessimist" is on the soundtrack of Transformers: Dark of the Moon
as an iTunes exclusive track. It is also available on their Facebook page as a free download.

The opening line of "The Pessimist", "Half alive and stark-raving free", became the first lines of Slipknot's song "Custer" off their album .5: The Gray Chapter.

There is also a recording of a spoken word by Corey Taylor, simply titled '2010' (as confirmed by Corey Taylor) in the vein of "Omega" and "The Frozen" on the previous records.

Personnel
Stone Sour
 Corey Taylor − lead vocals
 James Root − lead guitar
 Josh Rand − rhythm guitar
 Shawn Economaki − bass
 Roy Mayorga − drums, percussion

Additional personnel
 Steve Blacke − strings arrangement, strings on track 8

Technical personnel
 Nick Raskulinecz − producer, engineering
 Ted Jensen − mastering
 Chris Lord-Alge − mixing
 Randy Staub − mixing
 John Nicholson − drum tech
 Zach Blackstone − assistant mixing
 Paul Fig − engineering
 Nathan Yarborough − assistant engineering
 P.R. Brown − art direction, design, photography

Charts

References

2010 albums
Stone Sour albums
Roadrunner Records albums
Albums produced by Nick Raskulinecz